Boston City Council elections were held on November 7, 1995. Ten seats (six district representatives and four at-large members) were contested in the general election, as the incumbents for districts 2, 5, and 8 ran unopposed. Nine seats (five districts and the four at-large members) had also been contested in the preliminary election held on September 19, 1995.

At-large
Councillors Dapper O'Neil, Richard P. Iannella, and Peggy Davis-Mullen were re-elected. Councillor John A. Nucci, who had been elected Suffolk County clerk of courts in November 1994, did not seek re-election; his seat was won by former Boston Police Commissioner Francis Roache.

 Richard P. Iannella was elected Register of Probate of Suffolk County in November 1996, and subsequently resigned his council seat; Stephen J. Murphy, who had finished fifth in the general election for four seats, joined the council in February 1997 and served the remainder of Iannella's term.

District 1
Councillor Diane J. Modica was re-elected.

District 2
Councillor James M. Kelly ran unopposed and was re-elected.

District 3
Councillor Maureen Feeney was re-elected.

District 4
Councillor Charles Yancey was re-elected.

District 5
Councillor Daniel F. Conley ran unopposed and was re-elected.

District 6
Councillor Maura Hennigan was re-elected.

District 7
Councillor Gareth R. Saunders was re-elected.

District 8
Councillor Thomas M. Keane Jr. ran unopposed and was re-elected.

District 9
Councillor Brian J. McLaughlin announced in March 1995 that he would not seek re-election; his seat was won by Brian Honan.

See also
 List of members of Boston City Council

References

Further reading
 
 

City Council election
Boston City Council elections
Boston City Council election
Boston City Council